R. Kent Hughes (born March 1, 1942) is the former senior pastor of College Church in Wheaton, Illinois, United States. Hughes is the author of numerous books, including the best-selling Disciplines of a Godly Man. He is also editor and contributor for the projected 50-volume Preaching the Word series, including Mark: Jesus, Servant and Savior, which received the ECPA Gold Medallion Book Award for best commentary in 1990.  Hughes served as senior pastor of College Church for 27 years and retired at the end of 2006.  He moved to Wheaton from California, where he pastored two churches. He holds a BA from Whittier College, an M.Div. from Talbot School of Theology, a D.Min. from Trinity Evangelical Divinity School and a DD from Biola University. He lives in Pennsylvania state with his wife, Barbara, and he is the father of 4, grandfather of 26 and great grandfather of 14.

In 2008, a Festschrift was published in his honor. Preach The Word: Essays on Expository Preaching In Honor of R. Kent Hughes included contributions by David Jackman, D. A. Carson, Wayne Grudem, John F. MacArthur, Bruce Winter, J. I. Packer, Phillip Jensen, Philip Graham Ryken, and Peter Jensen. In the spring of 2019, he retired from teaching at Westminster Theological Seminary in Philadelphia, Pennsylvania.

Teaching and professional history
 Westminster Theological Seminary, 2015–2019
 Senior pastor of College Church in Wheaton, IL, 1979–2006
 Church planter in Southern California, 1974–1979
 Adjunct professor at Talbot School of Theology, 1974–1979
 Served variously as high school pastor, college pastor and associate pastor, 1963–1974
 Youth for Christ Club director, 1960–1961

Books
Disciplines of a Godly Family (with Barbara Hughes)
Disciplines of a Godly Man
Disciplines of Grace
Liberating Ministry from the Success Syndrome
Set Apart: Calling a Worldly Church to a Godly Life
The Christian Wedding Planner (with Ruth Muzzy)
The Coming Evangelical Crisis: Current Challenges to the Authority of Scripture and the Gospel
Worship by the Book (with Rev. Mark Ashton, Timothy J. Keller and D.A. Carson)
Mastering the Pastoral Role

Preaching the Word Series
Genesis: Beginning and Blessing
Exodus: Saved for God’s Glory (with Philip Graham Ryken)
Numbers: God’s Presence in the Wilderness (with Iain M. Duguid)
Isaiah: God Saves Sinners
Jeremiah and Lamentations: From Sorrow to Hope (with Philip Graham Ryken)
Daniel: The Triumph of God’s Kingdom (with Rodney Stortz)
The Sermon on the Mount: The Message of the Kingdom
Abba Father: The Lord's Pattern for Prayer
Mark: Jesus, Servant and Savior
Luke: That you May Know the Truth
John: That You May Believe
Acts: The Church Afire
Romans: Righteousness from Heaven
2 Corinthians: Power in Weakness
Ephesians: The Mystery of the Body of Christ
Philippians: The Fellowship of the Gospel
Colossians and Philemon: The Supremacy of Christ
1 and 2 Timothy and Titus: To Guard the Deposit
Hebrews: An Anchor for the Soul
James: Faith That Works

References

External links
 College Church in Wheaton

1942 births
Living people
American evangelicals
Christian writers
Writers from Wheaton, Illinois
Talbot School of Theology alumni
Trinity Evangelical Divinity School alumni
Whittier College alumni